Inges Idee is a German artist collective, formed in 1992, composed of Hans Hemmert, Axel Lieber, Thomas Schmidt, and George Zey.

Works

Works by Inges Idee:

See also

 List of German artists

References

External links

 Official site (English)

1992 establishments in Germany
German artist groups and collectives